VoxForge is a free speech corpus and acoustic model repository for open source speech recognition engines.

VoxForge was set up to collect transcribed speech to create a free GPL speech corpus for use with open source speech recognition engines. The speech audio files will be 'compiled' into acoustic models for use with open source speech recognition engines such as Julius, ISIP, and Sphinx and HTK (note: HTK has distribution restrictions).

VoxForge has used LibriVox as a source of audio data since 2007.

See also
 Speech recognition in Linux
 List of speech recognition software

References

Sources
 Deep learning for spoken language identification 
 VOXFORGE.ORG FREE SPEECH CORPUS (Google translate)
 Tools for Collecting Speech Corpora via Mechanical-Turk
 An Integrated Approach to Robust Speech Recognition for a Command and Control Application on the Motorcycle

External links
 

Computational linguistics
Free software projects
Speech recognition
Speech recognition software
Corpora